Four independent Olympic Athletes competed at the 2012 Summer Olympics in London, the United Kingdom. These were athletes from the former Netherlands Antilles, and from the newly formed state of South Sudan. This was the third time that athletes had competed as independent participants in the Olympics. None of the athletes won an Olympic medal.

Background

Netherlands Antilles
The Netherlands Antilles Olympic Committee, which had planned to continue functioning after the dissolution of the Netherlands Antilles in October 2010, had its membership withdrawn by the IOC Executive Committee at the IOC session of July 2011. However, athletes from the former Netherlands Antilles who qualified for the 2012 Olympics were allowed to participate independently under the Olympic flag, in addition to the possibility of competing for the Netherlands (as for example Churandy Martina did) or Aruba (because they have Dutch nationality). Ultimately, three athletes from the Netherlands Antilles participated as independent Olympic athletes.

South Sudan
South Sudan gained its independence from Sudan in July 2011. As of the 2012 Summer Olympics, it had not formed a National Olympic Committee. Athletes from this nation were therefore unable to enter with a National Olympic Committee (NOC). Guor Marial qualified for the men's marathon and competed as an independent Olympian.

Opening ceremony
Brooklyn Kerlin was the flag bearer of the athletes during the opening ceremony. She was chosen by her peers to represent the "makers of the Olympics". Hannah Bailes, a London 2012 Ceremonies Cast Member, who was also a volunteer, was selected to carry the Independent Olympic Athletes placard.

Sports

Athletics

Men

Judo

Sailing

Women

M = Medal race; EL = Eliminated – did not advance into the medal race;

See also
Independent Olympic Participants at the 1992 Summer Olympics
Individual Olympic Athletes at the 2000 Summer Olympics
Refugee Olympic Team at the 2016 Summer Olympics

References

 
Nations at the 2012 Summer Olympics
2012, Independent
Olym
2012 in Curaçao
2012, Independent
2012
2012 in South Sudanese sport